A referendum on the Arabic–African Federation Treaty (Oujda Treaty) was held in Morocco on 31 August 1984. The treaty would create a union of states between Morocco and Libya as part of a first step towards a "Great Arab Maghreb". It was approved by 99.98% of voters, with a 97% turnout.

Results

References

Morocco
Referendums in Morocco
1984 in Morocco
Libya–Morocco relations